Zhao Xu (born 16 November 1985) is a Paralympian athlete from China competing mainly in T46 classification sprint events.

Zhao represented his country at the 2008 Summer Paralympics in Beijing, where he competed at two events, the 100 and 200 metre sprints. He managed to make the finals of the 100 metre race, finishing just outside the medals in fourth place. Four years later, at the 2012 Paralympics in London he won two medals, a gold in the 100 meter sprint and a silver as part of the men's 100 metre relay team.

Personal history
Zhao was born in Yuxi, China in 1985. At the age of nine he touched a live electrical cable which resulted in the loss of his arms.

Notes

Paralympic athletes of China
Athletes (track and field) at the 2008 Summer Paralympics
Athletes (track and field) at the 2012 Summer Paralympics
Paralympic gold medalists for China
Paralympic silver medalists for China
Living people
1985 births
Medalists at the 2012 Summer Paralympics
Chinese male sprinters
People from Yuxi
Runners from Yunnan
Paralympic medalists in athletics (track and field)
Medalists at the 2010 Asian Para Games